Hugo Isaác Rodríguez de la O (born 8 June 1990) is a Mexican professional footballer who plays as a centre-back for Liga MX club Santos Laguna.

Career
Rodríguez debuted on April 10, 2010, with Club Atlas against Pachuca. Atlas went to win that match 2–0. On November 12, 2014, he made his debut with Mexico on a friendly win of 3–2 against the Netherlands.

Career statistics

International

Honours
Pachuca
Liga MX: Clausura 2016

Mexico U23
Pan American Games: 2011
CONCACAF Olympic Qualifying Championship: 2012
Toulon Tournament: 2012

References

External links
 
 https://web.archive.org/web/20141112060004/http://stats.televisadeportes.esmas.com/futbol/jugadores/hugo-isaac-rodriguez/11229

1990 births
Living people
Footballers from Guadalajara, Jalisco
Indigenous Mexicans
Footballers at the 2011 Pan American Games
Liga MX players
Association football forwards
Atlas F.C. footballers
Tigres UANL footballers
C.F. Pachuca players
Mexico international footballers
Pan American Games gold medalists for Mexico
Pan American Games medalists in football
Mexican footballers
Medalists at the 2011 Pan American Games